NRG Media is a media company headquartered in Cedar Rapids, Iowa and was founded in 2005.

History

NRG Media was founded on March 1, 2005, as a result of a merger of NewRadio Group and the radio assets of Waitt Media. At its inception it was the seventh largest radio company in the USA. , NRG owns and operates 40 radio stations and three translators in four Midwestern states.  With the exception of their stations in Omaha, Grand Island/Kearney, and Lincoln, Nebraska, NRG owns properties in small or medium, unrated markets. NRG Media, through the studios of its Omaha sports property KOZN, produces radio coverage of the NCAA's College World Series from TD Ameritrade Park in conjunction with national syndicator Westwood One.

Mary Quass is NRG Media's President/CEO. Mentoring and Inspiring Women in Radio (MIW) Group named Mary Quass the 2017 MIW Trailblazer.

Former properties
Waitt Radio Networks (purchased by Triton Media Group)

References

External links
NRG Media

Radio broadcasting companies of the United States
NRG Media radio stations